Aberdeen Airways may refer to:
 An airline formed in 1934, that changed its name to Allied Airways in 1937.
 An airline formed in 1989, following the takeover of Air Ecosse by Peregrine Air Services Ltd.